The 1916 Arkansas Razorbacks football team represented the University of Arkansas in the Southwest Conference (SWC) during the 1916 college football season. In their second and final year under head coach T. T. McConnell, the Razorbacks compiled a 4–4 record (0–2 against SWC opponents), finished in sixth place in the SWC, and outscored their opponents by a combined total of 261 to 124.

Schedule

References

Arkansas
Arkansas Razorbacks football seasons
Arkansas Razorbacks football